The sixth season of the hit Pakistani music television series Coke Studio was premiered on 27 October 2013.

Rohail Hyatt and Umber Hyatt continued as producers of the show. Among the houseband, Louis 'Gumby' Pinto & Jaffer Ali Zaidi returned to the show on drums and keyboards respectively after their absence from last season. Other members included Asad Ahmed on guitar, Babar Ali Khanna on dholak, Kamran ‘Mannu’ Zafar on bass, Sikandar Mufti on percussions and drums, Omran Shafique on guitar, Zoe Viccaji and Rachel Viccaji on backing vocals The houseband also featured international musicians for the first time in show's history, from countries like Italy, Serbia, Nepal, Turkey, Bangladesh, Morocco and Norway.

Artists 
The sixth season saw a return of artists like Atif Aslam, Ali Azmat, Zeb & Haniya, Sanam Marvi and Saieen Zahoor. This season marked the first time for foreign artists to be featured on the show, with the likes of Sweden-based Balochi singer Rostam Mirlashari and Turkish singer Sumru Ağıryürüyen.

Featured Artists 

 Abrar-ul-Haq
 Alamgir
 Ali Azmat
 Asad Abbas
 Atif Aslam
 Ayesha Omer
 Fariha Pervez
 Muazzam Ali Khan
 Rostam Mirlashari
 Rustam Fateh Ali Khan
 Saieen Zahoor
 Sanam Marvi
 Sumru Ağıryürüyen
 Umair Jaswal
 Zara Madani
 Zeb & Haniya
 Zoe Viccaji

Backing Vocals 

 Rachel Viccaji
 Zoe Viccaji

Musicians

Episodes
The webcast of sixth season began airing on 20 October 2013 and concluded on 5 January 2014
. The season featured 2 singles as season opener and 5 episodes, making a total of 20 songs.

All songs were arranged and produced by Rohail Hyatt. The show was produced at Rohail Hyatt's production company Frequency Media Pvt. Ltd and distributed by Coca-Cola Pakistan.

References

External links
 

Season06
2013 Pakistani television seasons